Jean-Luc Caron (born 4 December 1948 in Paris) is a French physician and musicologist.

Biography 
Caron is a doctor of medicine, founding president of the French Association Carl Nielsen, editor of the association's newsletter, author of essays, news, aphorisms and novels. He has specialized in the study and dissemination of North-European music which he regularly tries to present in articles, chronicles, monographs, lectures, radio programs and to place in its  Nordic and international historical and aesthetic context.
He is the author of a book on Carl Nielsen, as well as a book on Jean Sibelius, both published by L'Age d'Homme editions. 

Caron contributed to the establishment of the "ResMusica" website, specializing in classical music and dance.

Selected bibliography 
1989: Allan Pettersson, destin, douleur et musique, la vie et l'œuvre, 2009 (2nd edition)
1990: Carl Nielsen, Editions l'Age d'Homme, Lausanne, 500 pages.
1991: Grands symphonistes nordiques méconnus, Bulletin de l'Association française Carl Nielsen
1992: Kajanus and Wegelius, Bulletin de l'Association française Carl Nielsen
1992: Catalogue des principales œuvres instrumentales de Sibelius, Bulletin de l'Association française Carl Nielsen
1994: Edvard Grieg et Paris, Association française Carl Nielsen
1995: Petite histoire de la musique nordique à Paris, 1910–1953, Bulletin de l'Association française Carl Nielsen
1997: Jean Sibelius, Editions l'Age d'Homme, Paris, 
2003: Edvard Grieg, le Chopin du Nord, la vie et l'œuvre, Lausanne, l'Age d'Homme, 
2013: Jean-Luc Caron, Gérard Denizeau, Camille Saint-Saëns, Paris, Bleu Nuit, 
2015: Carl Nielsen,  Paris, Bleu Nuit, 178 pages.

References

External links 
 Jean-Luc Caron on Actes Sud

1948 births
Writers from Paris
20th-century French physicians
20th-century French musicologists
21st-century French musicologists
Classical music critics
Living people